The solution concept authority distribution was formulated by Lloyd Shapley and his student X. Hu in 2003 to measure the authority power of players in a well-contracted organization. The index generates the Shapley-Shubik power index and can be used in ranking, planning and organizational choice.

Definition

The organization contracts each individual by boss and approval relation with others. So each individual has its own authority structure, called command game. The Shapley-Shubik power index for these command games are
collectively denoted by a power transit matrix Ρ.

The authority distribution π is defined as the solution to the counterbalance equation π=πΡ. The basic idea for the counterbalance equation is that a person's power comes from his critical roles in others' command game; on the other hand, his power could also be redistributed to those who sit in his command game as vital players.

For a simple legislative body, π is simply the Shapley-Shubik power index, based on a probabilistic argument.

Applications

Example 1. College ranking by applicants’ acceptance

Suppose that there are large numbers of college applicants to apply the colleges
Each applicant files multiple applications. Each college then offers some
of its applicants admissions and rejects all others. Now some applicants may get no offer
from any college; the other then get one offer or multiple offers. An applicant with multiple
offers will decide which college to go to and reject all other colleges which make offers
to him. Of all applicants who apply to and receive offers from College i, we let P(i,j) be
the proportion of those applicants who decide to go to college j. Such applicants of
course apply to and receive offers from College j as well.

To rank the colleges by the acceptance rates of the applicants to whom offers were
made, we can apply the authority distribution associated with the matrix P. The so-called “authority distribution” can be regarded as the measure of relative
attractiveness of the colleges from the applicants’ point of view.

Example 2. Journal rankings by citations

Assume there are n journals in a scientific field. For any Journal i, each issue
contains many papers, and each paper has its list of references or citations. A paper in journal j
can be cited in another paper in Journal i as a reference. Of all papers cited by Journal i (repetition
counted), we let P(i,j) be the proportion of those papers which are published on Journal j. So P
measures the direct impact between any two journals and P(i, i) is the self-citation rate
for Journal i . The authority distribution for π = πP would quantify the long-term influence of
each journal in the group of journals and can be used to rank these journals.

Example 3. Planning of a freeway system

A few small towns believe that building a freeway system would be to their common
benefit. Say, they plan to build freeways F1, F2, ..., Fn−1. We let Fn be the existing traffic
channels of car, truck and bus. We assume that all the potential freeways have the same
length. Otherwise we can make up the assumption by dividing long freeways into smaller
segments and rename them all. The freeways with higher traffic intensity should be built
with more driving lanes and so receive more investments. Of all the traffic flow on Fi, we
let P(i,j) be the (estimated) proportion of the traffic flowing into Fj. Then the authority
distribution π satisfying π = πP will measure the relative traffic intensity on each Fi and
can be used in the investment allocation.

A similar issue can be found in designing an Internet or Intranet system.

Example 4. Real Effective Exchange Rates Weights

Assume there are n countries. Let P(i,j) be country j's weights of consumption of country's total production.
The associated π measures the weights in the trading system of n countries.

Example 5. Sort Big Data Objects by Revealed Preference

When ranking big data observations, diverse consumers reveal heterogeneous preferences; but any revealed preference is a ranking between two observations, derived from a consumer’s rational consideration of many factors. Previous researchers have applied exogenous weighting and multivariate regression approaches, and spatial, network, or multidimensional analyses to sort complicated objects, ignoring the variety and variability of the objects. By recognizing the diversity and heterogeneity among both the observations and the consumers, Hu (2000) instead applies endogenous weighting to these contradictory revealed preferences. The outcome is a consistent steady-state solution to the counterbalance equilibrium within these contradictions. The solution takes into consideration the spillover effects of multiple-step interactions among the observations. When information from data is efficiently revealed in preferences, the revealed preferences greatly reduce the volume of the required data in the sorting process.

See also
 Shapley value
 Shapley-Shubik power index
 Banzhaf power index

References

External links 
Online Power Index Calculator  (by Tomomi Matsui) 
Computer Algorithms for Voting Power Analysis Web-based algorithms for voting power analysis
Power Index Calculator Computes various indices for (multiple) weighted voting games online. Includes some examples.

Game theory
Cooperative games
Electoral systems